Meng Wei (born September 1956) is a former Chinese politician and environmentalist who served as president of the Chinese Research Academy of Environmental Sciences from 2001 to 2016. As of November 2017 he was under investigation by the Communist Party's anti-corruption agency. He was an academician of the Chinese Academy of Engineering. He was a deputy to the 11th and 12th National People's Congress. He was the first notable figure implicated in corruption following the 19th National Congress of the Chinese Communist Party on October 24, 2017. He is the third academician of the Chinese Academy of Engineering whose title has been revoked in the past two years, after Li Ning and Zhou Guotai. Meng Wei has been stripped of his post and party membership on April 4, 2018.

Career
Meng Wei was born in Qingdao, Shandong in September 1956. He graduated from the Ocean University of China. 

He entered the workforce in November 1976, and joined the Chinese Communist Party in July 1997.

After graduation, he was assigned to the Chinese Research Academy of Environmental Sciences, an academy affiliated to the Ministry of Environmental Protection of the People's Republic of China. He was appointed director of the Science and Technology Department of the Chinese Research Academy of Environmental Sciences, in July 1997, becoming vice-president in January 1999 and dean and president in December 2001.

In December 2009, he was elected a member of the Chinese Academy of Engineering.

In March 2013, he was elected deputy director of the Environmental and Resource Protection Committee of the National People's Congress.

Downfall
On November 10, 2017, the Central Commission for Discipline Inspection announced that Meng had been placed under investigation for "serious legal violations". Four days later, the Chinese Academy of Engineering revoked Meng's membership. 

On April 4, 2018, Meng Wei has been expelled from the Chinese Communist Party and removed from public office. The Central Commission for Discipline Inspection said in a statement that Meng violated the eight-point code on Party, went in and out of private clubs in violation of regulations, sought benefits for others in terms of job promotions, and illegally transferred shares and resulted huge losses of state-owned assets.

Works

Papers
 Modern Sedimentation Rates in the Intertidal Zone on the West Coast of the Bohai Gulf, Meng Wei, Lei Kun, Acta Oceanologica Sinica, 2005, vol.24. No.3　
 Preliminary Study on the Dissolved Oxygen Distributions and Influential Factors in the Daliao River Estuary and Its Adjacent Areas, Lei Kun, Meng Wei, Acta Oceanologica Sinica, 2004, Vol.23, No.1.
 Anpassung Des Umweltmanagement An Die Aktuelle Situation in China, Meng Wei, Luty Krapp, Mull and Abfall'' , 2002, Vol.34, No.3.

Books

References

1956 births
Living people
Scientists from Shandong
Ocean University of China alumni
People's Republic of China politicians from Shandong
Chinese Communist Party politicians from Shandong
Expelled members of the Chinese Communist Party
Members of the Chinese Academy of Engineering